The white-browed triller (Lalage moesta) is a species of bird in the family Campephagidae. It is endemic to Indonesia, where it occurs in the Tanimbar Islands.

References

white-browed triller
Birds of the Tanimbar Islands
white-browed triller
white-browed triller
Taxonomy articles created by Polbot